Yawuru is a Western Nyulnyulan language spoken on the coast south of Broome in Western Australia.

Grammatically it resembles other Nyulnyulan languages. It has a relatively free word order.

By the late 1990s the number of fluent speakers of Yawuru had dropped to a handful but a few younger people dedicated themselves to learning the language and they are now teaching it in schools and in adult classes, in Broome.

Phonology 
The vowel phonemes are short vowels /i/, /a/, and /u/, and long vowels /i:/, /a:/, and /u:/ (spelled ii, aa, uu).

Consonantal segments include:

Speakers also use glottal stops, implosives, and ejectives.

Syllable structure in the initial position is #CV(:) (C(C)), in the medial position is CV(:)(C), and in the final position is CV(C(C))#.  # representing the word boundary, C standing for consonant, V for vowel, and V: for long vowel.  The most common syllables are CV or CVC  (CV: or CV:C).

Orthography

Vowels
 a - [a]
 i - [i]
 u - [u]
 aa - [aː]
 ii - [iː]
 uu - [uː]

Consonants
 b - [b]
 d - [d]
 dy - [dʲ]
 g - [g]
 j - [d͡ʑ]
 k - [k]
 l - [l]
 ly - [lʲ]
 m - [m]
 n - [n]
 ny - [nʲ]
 ng - [ŋ]
 p - [p]
 r - [ɾ]
 rd - [ɖ]
 rl - [ɭ]
 rn - [ɲ]
 rr - [ɻ]
 rry - [rʲ]
 t - [t]
 ty - [tʲ]
 w - [w]
 y - [j]
 ' - [ʔ]

Grammar 
There is no noun class in Yawuru.  Adverbs belong to the same class as nominals.  There is a verb class.  Nouns and adjectives are distinguished through semantic context.

Morphology 
Nominals inflect for case and adverbs, belonging to this class, take case markers.  Case markers are signified by enclitics.    Nominals do not have a declension class. Verbs inflect to denote person, number, tense, mood, and aspect.  Prefixes, suffixes, and enclitics are used to conjugate verbs.

There are four person categories in Yawuru: first person, second person, third person, and fourth person, which is made up by a first person inclusive (includes the speaker and the hearer).

Syntax 
Word order is flexible, with the verb often preceding the subject.

Vocabulary 
Yawuru has a large borrowing from Pama-Nyungan languages, neighboring languages.  The vocabulary is specifically strong in terms of environment, reflecting on the culture.

References

Nyulnyulan languages